is a Japanese term which literally means "a beautiful person" and is synonymous with . The term originally derives from the Chinese word , and the word  is used widely in several Asian countries including China, South Korea, North Korea, and Vietnam.

Meaning

In practice the term  means "beautiful woman" because the first kanji character, has a feminine connotation. The character expressed the concept of beauty by first using the element for "sheep", which must have been viewed as beautiful, and was combined with the element for "big", ultimately forming a new kanji.  can also be translated as "a beauty". Its modern meaning was also said to have undergone an internationalization, with the term for the moon and then a lord or ruler on high.

In Mandarin Chinese,  also means "a beautiful woman". Like Mandarin Chinese, in Korean,  means "a beautiful woman", and in Vietnamese,  also means "beautiful woman".

Beautiful image in Japan 

During the Heian period in Japan, fine-textured fair skin, plump cheeks, and long, supple black hair were revered as typical beauty conditions. However, since it was decided that a woman with a certain status or higher would not show her face to a man other than her close relatives, the man would sneak into the sleeping place of the woman he was looking for and see it for the first time under a dim light. Makeup involved applying white powder to the face, removing the eyebrows, drawing with ink, and dyeing the teeth black, emphasizing bewitching rather than healthy beauty. The adult age of women at that time was 12 to 14 years old, which was the beginning of the tide, and the 30s were considered to have already passed the peak age.  is the name of the expression technique used when drawing a noble person in Heian paintings, such as scenes taken from The Tale of Genji.

Westerner Luis Frois, who stayed in Japan for more than 30 years during the Warring States period, said, "Europeans say big eyes are beautiful. The Japanese consider it horrifying and make it beautiful to have the eyes closed." This describes how the Japanese at that time idealized the smaller eyes as depicted in picture scrolls and  rather than big eyes. 

From the Edo period onwards, beauty standards in Japan came to idealise light skin, delicate features, a small mouth, a high forehead, small eyes and rich black hair, as depicted in many  pictures. In the best-selling makeup instruction book "Miyako Customs Makeup Den" at that time, there was a section called "Den to see the greatness of the eyes", which shows that the eyes had a different aesthetic sense from the present. Saikaku Ihara's "Five Women Who Loved Love" has a description that he makes an unreasonable wish at a shrine to raise his low nose, suggesting that he preferred the height of his nose at that time. This sense of beauty became the basis of the image of beautiful women from the Meiji era to the Taisho era.

In Japanese art

Some of the greatest bijinga artists are Utamaro, Suzuki Harunobu and Torii Kiyonaga. Until the beginning of the 20th century,  were very popular.

Famous

Nihon Sandai Bijin (The Three Beauties of Japan) 
Nihon Sandai Bijin (The Three Beauties of Japan) is a term referring to several three women that were considered the most beautiful in Japan.

 Three Beauties of Taishō period: 
 Takeko Kujō
 Byakuren Yanagiwara
 Egi Kinkin
Hayashi Kimuko
 Three Beauties of the Present Day:
 Tomimoto Toyohina
 Naniwaya Okita
 Takashima Ohisa
 Three Beauties of Japan:
 Fujiwara no Michitsuna's mother
 Soto-ori-hime
 Ono no Komachi

Akita bijin 
Akita, in northern Japan, is famous for the " of Akita" who are characterized by their round face, clear skin and high-pitched voice. Ono no Komachi, one of the Thirty-six Immortals of Poetry, was a bijin from Akita.

Utamaro's bijin 

Gallery

See also

References

Notes

Bibliography
 Images du Monde Flottant - Peintures et estampes japonaises XVIIe - XVIIIe siècles. (Septembre 2004)

Beauty
Japanese words and phrases
Culture articles needing translation from Japanese Wikipedia